John Philip Morier (1776–1853) was an English diplomat.

Early life
The eldest of the four sons of Isaac Morier, and was born at Smyrna 9 November 1776; James Justinian Morier, David Richard Morier and William Morier were his brothers. He was known as Jack. The family returned to England in 1787, where he had school education under Samuel Jay at Greenwich, Andover and Eagle House, Wimbledon under Thomas Lancaster. He was placed in his father's counting house in 1793.

Diplomat in the East Mediterranean
In 1794 Morier returned to Smyrna, working in the family business there. He was attached to the embassy at Constantinople on 5 April 1799, where he acted as private secretary to the ambassador, Thomas Bruce, 7th Earl of Elgin.

Morier was despatched by Elgin on 22 December 1799 on special service of observation to Egypt. Elgin in fact wanted to take in the situation which he had faced on arrival, of William Sidney Smith running the negotiations between the Ottomans and the French. Morier was accompany the Grand Vizier in the Turkish expedition against General Jean Baptiste Kléber, whom Napoleon had left to hold the country. Morier joined the Turkish army at Arish, on the Egyptian frontier, 31 January 1800, and remained with it until July.

In March 1800 Morier was with the Grand Vizier, but felt it essential to inform Smith of the situation. He went to Damietta and set off in a small boat, searching for HMS Tigre; but was driven ashore and taken prisoner by the French. Moved to Rosetta and then Alexandria, he was able to benefit from a hostage exchange and was allowed to proceed by the French.

In December 1803 Morier was appointed consul-general in Albania, where the policy of Ali Pasha of Joannina, a semi-independent Ottoman vassal, was an ongoing concern for British and French diplomacy. This posting was new, and was also a move to restrict the freedom of action of the Levant Company; and in public the Company acquiesced. In 1805, however, there was a clash over duties collected by the Company's representative at Patras.

Later life
In April 1810 Morier was promoted to be secretary of legation at Washington DC, where Augustus Foster in time arrived with fuller powers. Morier was running the legation, however, from August 1810; the US government took his status as an affront, and withdrew William Pinkney from London in 1811, before Foster was appointed. Morier's views in a letter on the West Florida controversy were found provocative by President James Madison. Congress debated letters from Morier, and correspondence between Vicente Folch y Juan and John McKee, behind closed doors, in January 1811; and it passed a bill Madison had requested, on excluding foreign powers from Florida.

In October 1811 Morier was gazetted a commissioner in Spanish America, with George Cockburn and Charles Stuart (but Thomas Sydenham took Stuart's place). In 1814 he was in Norway.

On his return to England, Morier became for a while acting under-secretary of state for foreign affairs in August 1815. On 5 February 1816 he was appointed envoy extraordinary to the court of Saxony at Dresden, a post he held till his retirement, on pension, 5 January 1825. He died in London 20 August 1853.

Works
Morier published Memoir of a Campaign with the Ottoman Army in Egypt from February to July 1800 (London, 1801).

Family
Morier married, on 3 December 1814, Horatia Maria Frances (who survived him only six days), eldest daughter of Lord Hugh Seymour, youngest son of Francis Seymour-Conway, 1st Marquess of Hertford. They had seven daughters, of whom:

Frances Horatia, the eldest, married Edward Harbottle Grimston, son of James Walter Grimston, 1st Earl of Verulam and rector of Pebmarsh, on 15 June 1842.
Horatia Isabella Harriet, second daughter, married in 1845 Algernon St Maur, 14th Duke of Somerset.
Katherine Georgina, the fourth, married Francis Sylvester Grimston, another son of the 1st Earl of Verulam and rector of Wakes Colne, on 1 February 1847.

Notes

 
Attribution
 

1776 births
1853 deaths
British diplomats
English writers
John Philip